Johnny Le'Mon Thomas (born December 15, 1971) is a former American football wide receiver who played four seasons with the St. Louis Rams of the National Football League. He was drafted by the St. Louis Rams in the seventh round of the 1995 NFL Draft. He first attended San Bernardino Valley College before transferring to Arizona State University and attended San Bernardino High School in San Bernardino, California.

References

External links
Just Sports Stats

Living people
1971 births
Players of American football from California
American football wide receivers
African-American players of American football
Arizona State Sun Devils football players
St. Louis Rams players
Sportspeople from San Bernardino, California
American football return specialists
21st-century African-American sportspeople
20th-century African-American sportspeople